Agosk (also Romanized as Āgosk; also known as Agosk-e Moḩammadābād and Āgūsk) is a village in Karvandar Rural District, in the Central District of Khash County, Sistan and Baluchestan Province, Iran. At the 2006 census, its population was 39, in 7 families.

References 

Populated places in Khash County